Çağlayan is an underground station on the M7 line of the Istanbul Metro in Kağıthane. The station is located on Abide-i Hürriyet Street in the Çağlayan neighborhood of Kağıthane.

The station, located to the north of the Istanbul Justice Palace, has 3 entrance / exit points. There are only 12 escalators in the east entrance ( number 1) and are not suitable for disabled passengers. On the western entrances, (entrance number 2 and 3) there are 4 escalators and 3 elevators between the street level and the turnstile floor; There are only 12 elevators between the turnstile floor and the platform floor and are suitable for disabled passengers.

The M7 line operates as fully automatic unattended train operation (UTO). The station consists of an island platform with two tracks. Since the M7 is an ATO line, protective gates on each side of the platform open only when a train is in the station.

Connection to IETT city buses is available from at street level.

Çağlayan station was opened on 28 October 2020.

Station layout

Connections 
Connection to IETT city buses is available from at street level. Çağlayan Metrobus Station is a metrobus station serving Metrobuses operated by IETT in Istanbul. It is located in the south of Istanbul Justice Palace. Çağlayan Metrobus station was opened on 8 September 2008. There is approximately 1 km walking distance between Çağlayan Metro and Metrobus stations.

Operation information 
As of 2021, total length of M7 line is 18 km. The line operates between 06.00 - 00.00 and travel frequency is 6 minutes at peak hour.

Gallery

See also 

 Istanbul Justice Palace
 Çağlayan (Metrobus)

References

External links 

 Official Website of Istanbul Metro (in English)

Railway stations opened in 2020
Istanbul metro stations
Kağıthane
2020 establishments in Turkey